Kenneth Franzheim II (September 12, 1925 – October 29, 2007) was a Houston oilman, philanthropist, and envoy. He served under U.S. President Richard Nixon as the United States Ambassador to New Zealand, Western Samoa, Tonga and Fiji from 1969 to 1972.

References

External links
 Selections from the Franzheim Rare Books Room Kenneth Franzheim II Rare Books Room ,William R. Jenkins Architecture and Art Library, University of Houston Digital Library.

1925 births
2007 deaths
Ambassadors of the United States to New Zealand
Ambassadors of the United States to Samoa
Ambassadors of the United States to Tonga
Ambassadors of the United States to Fiji
Businesspeople from Houston
20th-century American businesspeople
20th-century American philanthropists
20th-century American diplomats